Stephen Butler (born 27 January 1962 in Birmingham) is an English former footballer. During his professional career he played over 400 matches and scored over 150 goals for Brentford, Maidstone United, Watford, AFC Bournemouth, Cambridge United, Gillingham and Peterborough United, including eight goals in two consecutive games that were only two days apart.

In 2000, at the age of 38, Butler scored his last professional goal for Gillingham in the Football League Second Division play-off final at Wembley Stadium as the Kent club secured its first ever promotion to the second tier of English football.

Honours
Individual
PFA Team of the Year: 1990–91 Fourth Division

References

Living people
1962 births
Footballers from Birmingham, West Midlands
English footballers
Maidstone United F.C. (1897) players
Peterborough United F.C. players
Gillingham F.C. players
Brentford F.C. players
Watford F.C. players
AFC Bournemouth players
Cambridge United F.C. players
Maidstone United F.C. players
Leicester City F.C. non-playing staff
Association football forwards